Top Model, also called Next Top Model, is a fashion-themed reality television show format produced in many countries throughout the world and seen in over 120 countries producing over 200 seasons, which are referred to as "cycles". The show takes the form of a modeling competition whose winners typically receive a contract with a major modeling agency and a cover shoot and fashion photo spread in a fashion magazine. The format was created by Tyra Banks for the original series, America's Next Top Model, which first aired in 2003 and was produced by Ken Mok's 10 by 10 Entertainment.

Format description

Contestants
Each cycle of the show consists of 6–40 episodes and begins with 9–35 contestants. In each episode one contestant is eliminated, though in some cases there may be double eliminations, multiple eliminations, or no elimination at all, based on the consensus of the judging panel. Makeovers are administered to contestants early in the cycle, usually before the first elimination or after the first or second elimination.

Challenges
Each episode usually begins with the contestants receiving training in an area concurrent with the week's theme. For example, contestants may get coached in runway walking, improvisational acting, and clothing to suit various occasions. A related challenge soon follows, such as a mock (or real) runway show or interview, where one of the models  is chosen as the winner (sometimes more than 1 models win the challenge).

The winner of the challenge receives some prizes, such as a contract, a night out, or an advantage at the next photo shoot. The winning contestant is sometimes permitted to share their reward with other contestants of  their choosing and on some occasions, may gain immunity from elimination at the next judging. Losing the challenge can result in some minor punishment, like losing frames for the next photo shoot. It can also end in the immediate elimination of the contestant.

Each episode, which covers the events of roughly one week of real time, is usually associated with a theme in the world of modeling, such as dealing with the press in interviews, selling a commercial product, appearing in a runway show, or visiting prospective employers in "go-sees".

In some franchises, the contestants will go to real-life castings. The model who is chosen will complete what is required for the casting, resulting in a leave of absence within the episode – sometimes skipping the photo shoot and other challenges – but is rewarded with immunity for booking the job.

Photo shoots
The next segment is usually a photo shoot, which may involve beauty shots (closeup photos emphasizing the face), posing in swimwear, lingerie or other clothing, posing nude or semi-nude, posing with a male model, or posing with animals among other themes. Usually, one photo shoot per cycle is replaced with a television commercial or music video shoot.

Performance in each week's photo or video shoot weighs heavily in the final judging.

Judging
The final segment of each episode involves judging by a panel of fashion industry experts. In addition to the regular judges, usually, there is a special guest judge related to that week's theme. Contestants are sometimes given a final challenge in some area of modeling such as posing, runway walking, selling a product, or choosing an appropriate outfit or makeup to satisfy a given situation. Each contestant's photo or video performance is then shown and evaluated by the panel. After all the content has been evaluated, the contestants leave the room and the judges deliberate. Germany, Austria, and Indonesia (cycle 2 - present) feature a themed runway segment in addition to the judging of the photos or videos.

The elimination process follows a rigid format, as the host reveals, one by one and in order of merit, the photos of the contestants who have not been eliminated. Each photo is given to the corresponding contestant, who is told by the host something similar to, "Congratulations. You are still in the running towards becoming [this country or region's] Next Top Model." The first-called contestant may receive additional benefits, such as having their photo displayed prominently in the contestants' living quarters or being allowed to share in the following week's challenge winnings, regardless of their performance in the challenge. The last two contestants who have not received their photos are brought forward for special critiques by the host before the final photo is revealed. The contestant who does not receive a photo is thus eliminated from the competition. Sometimes the last two contestants are both eliminated; rarely, neither is eliminated. Multiple eliminations can also take place.

In some versions of the show, contestants find out whether or not they will continue on in the competition in a completely random fashion. The contestants may be called forward in random order to find out whether or not they performed best during the week. The last two contestants are usually the worst performers. This format is followed by Denmark (cycle 4), the Netherlands (cycles 6–9) and Peru.

In other cases, the models are each called back into the elimination room after deliberation. Upon being called back, they are either eliminated on the spot, declared safe, or they are asked to wait for their results. If the latter happens, the process is repeated with the remaining pool of contestants in danger. This elimination format has been followed by several versions of the show, most notably Austria (cycles 2–9), Germany and Denmark (cycles 2–3,5–6) along with two former versions; Croatia and Serbia.

Episodes typically end with the image of the eliminated models fading away from a group shot of the remaining contestants.

International destinations
A trip to an international destination is typically scheduled at about two-thirds of the way through the competition, usually with five or six contestants remaining. While overseas, each episode covers roughly three to four days, totaling two weeks of filming abroad. In some international versions, contestants have traveled from two to six different countries.

Live shows
In some versions of the show, the winner is determined during a live broadcast. This has been done in Germany, Russia, Croatia, Israel, Belgium, the Netherlands (cycles 2-10), Benelux (a combination of the former two), Austria, Serbia, New Zealand (cycle 3), Australia (cycles 3–8), Britain (cycle 6), Poland, Vietnam and Greece (cycle 3). Votes are usually submitted via SMS or on any other given website. In cycle 17 of America's Next Top Model the first panel was presented in front of a live crowd, but this wasn't broadcast until the cycle premiere some months later. Also, the elimination process was shot privately during the production.

All-Stars
Cycle 17 of America's Next Top Model featured returning models from previous cycles with an All-Stars competition. In cycle 18 of the same version, seven British models from Britain's Next Top Model competed along with new American contestants. The eighth cycle of Vietnam's Next Top Model also featured returning models from previous cycles. The seventh cycle of Top Model po-ukrainsky also featured returning models from previous cycles.

Social media voting, Scoring and Comeback series
Through cycles 19-21, America's Next Top Model enabled social media fans to vote for each contestant's photos online based on a scale ranging from 1 (being the worst) to 10 (being the best). Voting took place as filming progressed, so that the results could be seen when the show began to air on television. Each judge also scored each picture based on the same scale, with the total fan vote weighing the same as the vote of a judge. Furthermore, one or more eliminated contestants received the opportunity to re-enter the competition if they earned the highest overall score average over a certain period of time. The social media voting was removed beginning with cycle 22.

The social media scoring system was also implemented in the sixth and seventh cycles of Austria's Next Topmodel. In contrast to the American adaptation, each voter is required to cast their votes on the show's website with accounts that link with Facebook. Furthermore, there is no grading scale. Each Facebook account is allotted three votes, which can be spent on any combination of contestants. The contestant with the highest number of votes each round is granted immunity, while the contestant with the lowest amount is automatically nominated for elimination along with three other contestants chosen by the judges. A comeback round also takes place about two thirds into the competition.

A separate scoring system, without social media voting, was introduced in the ninth cycle of Australia's Next Top Model. The combined challenge and judge scores are used to determine who will be eliminated each week. It was also the system used in the twenty-second cycle of America's Next Top Model, and adapted by other versions of the show.

Criticism
The German version of the show (Germany's Next Topmodel) is heavily criticized in Germany because of the treatment of its contestants.     The allegations include Gaslighting, Abuse of power, misrepresentation of contestants  and Manipulations by the crew  as well as Body shaming.

International Top Model series

The Top Model format has been adapted for numerous national and regional versions around the world. 
  Currently in production
  Currently not in production

Table notes:

Winners over time

Please note: This is a collapsible table, click [show] to expand and see its contents.

Current and upcoming cycles

The following table contains current and upcoming cycles of Top Model listed in chronological order.

  Currently airing

See also
 List of television show franchises

References

External links

 
Television franchises